The  African Union Commission (AUC) acts as the executive/administrative branch or secretariat of the African Union (and is somewhat analogous to the European Commission).  It consists of a number of Commissioners dealing with different areas of policy.  The African Union Headquarters are in Addis Ababa, Ethiopia. It should be distinguished from the African Commission on Human and Peoples' Rights, (based in Banjul, Gambia), which is a separate body that reports to the African Union.

History
On September 13, 2005 an agreement was reached by the Commission and France whereby France would donate €5 million for the furtherance of African Union activities. Some of the initiatives this money will go to are an African Communication Policy and an African Common Defence Force. The signatory on behalf of the Commission was Bernard Zoba.

The African Union Commission became a part of the Forum on China–Africa Cooperation (FOCAC) in 2012. FOCAC is the main multi-lateral coordination mechanism between the African countries and China. Since joining FOCAC, the African Union Commission has increasingly played a coordinating role, although each African country in FOCAC continues to represent itself individually.

Key members
Moussa Faki is Chairman of the Commission, replacing Nkosazana Dlamini-Zuma in January 2017.
Thomas Kwesi Quartey is Deputy Chairman.
Directorate of Conference Management and Publications is headed by Nedjat Khellaf
Directorate of Peace and Security is headed by Ramtane Lamamra 
Directorate of Political Affairs is headed by Julia Dolly Joiner 
Directorate of Infrastructure and Energy is headed by Elham Mahmood Ibrahim 
Directorate of Social Affairs is headed by Amira Elfadi
Directorate of Human Resources, Science and Technology is headed by Nagia Essayed 
African Union High Representative for Infrastructure Development is Raila Odinga since October 2018. Prior to this, the Directorate of Trade and Industry was headed by Elisabeth Tankeu. 
Directorate of Rural Economy and Agriculture is headed by Rosebud Kurwijila
Directorate of Economic Affairs is headed by Maxwell Mkwezalamba 
Office of the Legal Counsel is headed by Ben Kioko

References

External links
Official website

 
Organisations based in Addis Ababa